The 1934 LSU Tigers football team represented Louisiana State University (LSU) in the 1934 college football season.

Schedule

Huey Long incident
Throughout Lawrence "Biff" Jones' head coaching career at LSU, U.S. Senator Huey P. Long had reportedly interfered with his decision-making and recruiting. At halftime of LSU's 1934 final home game against Oregon, with the Tigers trailing 13–0, Long approached the team's locker room and demanded to speak with the team. Tired of Long's meddling with the team, Jones informed the Senator that he would quit after the game, "win, lose, or draw." The Tigers would come back and defeat the Ducks 14–13, and Jones would make good on his promise, leaving the program to coach the Oklahoma Sooners and later the Nebraska Cornhuskers. Bernie Moore, LSU's track and field coach, would take over the head football coach position. Moore had coached LSU to the NCAA track and field championship in 1933.  Both Jones and Moore would wind up being elected to the College Football Hall of Fame.

References

Bibliography
 

LSU
LSU Tigers football seasons
LSU Tigers football